Fabio Caserta (born 24 September 1978) is an Italian football coach and former player who was most recently manager of Benevento.

Playing career
After a long career playing in minor divisions (Serie D with Locri, and Serie C2 with Igea Virtus), he was signed by Serie B side Catania in 2004, becoming a team leader and a fan favourite, as well as a protagonist in the successful 2005–06 campaign that brought the rossazzurri back into Serie A. After an impressive 2006–07 season, he was then signed on 31 August 2007 by arch-rivals Palermo.  On 31 July 2008, Serie A newcomers Lecce bought the contract of Caserta from Palermo for €1.6million.

He was successively acquired by Atalanta for the 2009–10 season, after Lecce were relegated to Serie B.

On 24 June 2010, he was loaned to Serie A newcomer Cesena along with Maximiliano Pellegrino, as part of the deal that Atalanta bought Ezequiel Schelotto outright.

Coaching career
After retirement, he stayed at Juve Stabia as part of head coach Gaetano Fontana's staff.

On 15 July 2017 he was announced as Juve Stabia's new head coach. On his second season in charge, he guided Juve Stabia to direct promotion to Serie B as Serie C/C winners. He left Juve Stabia following their relegation at the end of the 2019–20 season.

On 26 August 2020 he was hired by Serie C club Perugia. On his first season in charge, Perugia were crowned Girone B champions, thus ensuring themselves promotion to Serie B after only one season in the Italian third tier.

On 15 June 2021, one day after leaving Perugia by mutual consent, Caserta was unveiled as the new head coach of Serie B club Benevento, signing a two-year deal with the Campanians. After guiding Benevento to a playoff spot in his first season, he was confirmed for the 2022–23 campaign, and dismissed on 20 September 2022 following a disappointing start of the season.

Managerial statistics

Honours

Managerial
Juve Stabia
Serie C: 2018–19 (Girone C)

Perugia
Serie C: 2020–21 (Girone B)

References 

Living people
1978 births
A.S.D. Igea Virtus Barcellona players
Catania S.S.D. players
U.S. Lecce players
Atalanta B.C. players
A.C. Cesena players
U.S. Pergolettese 1932 players
Palermo F.C. players
S.S. Juve Stabia players
Serie A players
Serie B players
Association football midfielders
Italian footballers
Sportspeople from the Metropolitan City of Reggio Calabria
Italian football managers
A.C. Perugia Calcio managers
Benevento Calcio managers
Serie B managers
Serie C managers
Footballers from Calabria